My Guardian Abby is a Philippine television drama series broadcast by QTV. Starring Nadine Samonte in the title role, it premiered on November 15, 2005. The series concluded on April 25, 2006, with a total of 24 episodes. It was replaced by Na-Scam Ka Na Ba? in its timeslot.

Overview
Every week, the show features different guest stars with different plots. In the story, there are three types of angels: white angels, child angels that stay in heaven; pink angels, who go down to earth to help mortals; and the blue angels, who help the pink angels in their mission. Pauleen, a blue angel, acts as Abby's guide whenever she has to go down and aid the mortals, and in the process, teaching her all about life.

Cast and characters

Lead cast
 Nadine Samonte as Pink Angel Abby

Supporting cast
 Pauleen Luna as Blue Angel Elisha
 Danilo Barrios
 Benjie Paras
 Maureen Larrazabal as Lucy
 Jonalyn Viray as Guardian J
 Sheena Halili as Devi
 Margaret Nales Wilson as Badsy

References

External links
 

2005 Philippine television series debuts
2006 Philippine television series endings
Filipino-language television shows
Philippine drama television series
Q (TV network) original programming
Television shows set in the Philippines